Middle Eastern architecture may refer to several broad styles of architecture historically or currently associated with the Middle East region, including:

 Islamic architecture
 Iranian architecture
 Ottoman architecture